Pedro Ruíz Corredor (d. after 1601) was a Spanish conquistador who participated in the Spanish conquest of the Muisca. He searched for El Dorado, returned to Spain, was sent back to the new world, helped consolidate newly conquered Peru for Spain, retired to his fiefdom to raise a family, and lived to a ripe old age.

Biography

El Dorado
The origins of Pedro Ruíz Corredor are unknown. He arrived from Spain in Santa Marta in 1533. Ruíz Corredor joined the expedition of Gonzalo Jiménez de Quesada in the quest for El Dorado, leaving Santa Marta in April 1536. Ruíz Corredor received the encomienda of Oicatá and Nemuza. His brother Miguel was mayor of Tunja in 1591 and 1598.

Peru
Pedro Ruíz Corredor returned to Spain with the valuables he had obtained in the New Kingdom of Granada. In 1548 he was sent to Peru, where he assisted the troops of Pedro de la Gasca and Gonzalo Pizarro. In June 1570, Ruíz Corredor was back in Oicatá and ordered the Muisca of his encomienda, and the villages of Chivatá, Motavita, Suta, Cómbita and Moniquirá to construct acequias, channels for the drainage of the lands. In 1601 Ruíz Corredor is mentioned as he having promised to pay the native people in his encomienda 200 cotton mantles, but only supplying half of that.

Personal life
Pedro Ruíz Corredor married Elvira Pérez de Cuéllar and the couple had one daughter; María Ruíz Corredor. Elvira's sister Isabel was married to Bartolomé Camacho Zambrano, a fellow conquistador in Colombia. The place and year of his death are unknown.

Encomienda

See also 

 List of conquistadors in Colombia
 Spanish conquest of the Muisca
 Spanish conquest of the Inca Empire, Hernán Pérez de Quesada
 Gonzalo Jiménez de Quesada

References

Bibliography

Further reading 
 
 
 
 
 
 
 
 

Year of birth unknown
Year of death unknown
16th-century Spanish people
16th-century explorers
17th-century Spanish people
Spanish conquistadors
Encomenderos
Mayors of Bogotá
History of Colombia
History of the Muisca